Steven Jack Rudy (born August 9, 1978) is a Kentucky politician and agribusiness owner, serving as a Republican member of the Kentucky House of Representatives since defeating longtime Representative Charles Geveden in 2004. He has served as the House Majority Leader since 2021.

Early life

Steven Jack Rudy was born to Methodists, parents Jack and Jeanette Rudy of Ballard County on August 9, 1978. Rudy was educated in the Ballard County School system, and graduated from Ballard Memorial High School in 1996. Rudy attended college at the former Paducah Community College (now West Kentucky Community and Technical College) and graduated from Murray State University in 2000 with a bachelor's degree in Agriculture Education.  While at Murray he was a member of the Future Farmers of America.

Political career
In late 2003, Rudy declared his candidacy for the 2004 election for State Representative in Kentucky's 1st Legislative House District. Running against Representative Charles Geveden of Wickliffe a former prosecutor and Chair of the House State Government Committee with 17 years of service. Rudy launched a campaign against Rep. Geveden, including sending out mailers before the election stating that Geveden was in favor of many liberal social positions.

On November 4, 2004 Rudy, buoyed by strong returns from McCracken County, defeated Geveden by around 1500 votes, to be the first ever Republican elected to the seat.

Rudy won re-election in 2006 handily, defeating retired Coast Guard veteran Thomas French by over 2000 votes.

In the 2008 session of the Kentucky General Assembly, Rudy introduced legislation that would allow for nuclear plants to be built in Kentucky without having a permanent waste disposal facility, in an attempt to end the state's moratorium on nuclear power plants. The legislation did not pass.

Rudy was challenged in 2008 by McCracken County Circuit Clerk Mike Lawrence, a Vietnam War veteran who has won two Bronze Stars and served as a reservist for 24 years. Rudy won the re-election bid by over 1200 votes.

In the 2009 session of the Kentucky General Assembly Rudy filed the legislation lifting the moratorium on nuclear power plants. The General Assembly adjourned sine die without the matter passing the house.

Animal protection

In 2015, Rudy came under fire for tacking an amendment prohibiting videotaping cruel treatment of agricultural animals, commonly known as an "ag gag bill", on to KY HB 177, a bill designed to assure that animals in Kentucky have adequate shelter. The Animal Legal Defense Fund has rated Kentucky the worst state for animal protection for ten years in a row.

References

1978 births
21st-century American politicians
Living people
Republican Party members of the Kentucky House of Representatives
Murray State University alumni
People from Paducah, Kentucky